The Mayor of Salem is the first citizen of Salem, a metropolitan city in the State of Tamil Nadu, southern India. The mayor is an elected officeholder who, along with 60 councillors of the Salem City Municipal Corporation is the chief administrator of the city.

The mayor is elected directly by the electorate. This was temporarily scrapped in 2006 in favour of an indirect election among the councillors. The process of direct elections was brought back in 2011 on the recommendation of the Election Commission of India.

The office of Mayor of Salem, like all other mayors in Tamil Nadu, was vacant from 25 October 2016 to 4 March 2022 due to repeated delays in holding civic polls in the State. Following the 2022 urban polls, A. Ramachandran of the Dravida Munnetra Kazhagam (DMK) was sworn in as the sixth Mayor of Salem on 4 March 2022.

List of mayors

Notes

References

External links
 Mayor of Salem

Mayor
Salem, Tamil Nadu
 
Mayor
Lists of people from Tamil Nadu
Salem, Tamil Nadu-related lists
Tamil Nadu politics-related lists
Salem City Municipal Corporation